Cheshmeh-ye Shah Qoli (also Romanized as Cheshmeh-ye Shāh Qolī and Cheshmeh Shāh Qolī) is a village in Honam Rural District, in the Central District of Selseleh County, Lorestan Province, Iran. At the 2006 census, its population was 246, in 58 families.

References 

Towns and villages in Selseleh County